Laurence Modaine-Cessac (born 28 December 1964) is a French fencer. She won a bronze medal in the women's team foil at the 1984 Summer Olympics.

References

External links
 

1964 births
Living people
French female foil fencers
Olympic fencers of France
Fencers at the 1984 Summer Olympics
Fencers at the 1988 Summer Olympics
Fencers at the 1992 Summer Olympics
Fencers at the 1996 Summer Olympics
Olympic bronze medalists for France
Olympic medalists in fencing
People from Douai
Medalists at the 1984 Summer Olympics
Sportspeople from Nord (French department)
20th-century French women